Indian Deep Space Network (IDSN) is a network of large antennas and communication facilities operated by the Indian Space Research Organisation to support the interplanetary spacecraft missions of India. Its hub is located at Byalalu, Ramanagar in the state of Karnataka in India. It was inaugurated on 17 October 2008 by the former ISRO chairman G. Madhavan Nair.

Similar networks are run by USA, China, Russia, Europe, and Japan.

Introduction

The network consists of the ISRO Telemetry, Tracking and Command Network (ISTRAC), augmented by a fully steerable  and a  DSN antenna which improves the visibility duration when compared with the existing ISTRAC system. The Indian Deep Space Network implements a baseband system adhering to Consultative Committee for Space Data Systems (CCSDS) Standards, thus facilitating cross-support among the Telemetry Tracking Command (TTC) agencies.

The two antennas at the Byalalu complex have built-in support facilities.  A fibre optic link will provide necessary communication link between the DSN station and SCC/NCC/ISSDC. The 18 m antenna is provisioned to receive two downlink carriers in S band and two carriers in X band (RCP and LCP), whereas the uplink is either RCP or LCP. It has a G/T of 30/39.5 dB/k (45° elevation, clear sky) for S/X-Band.

The 32 m antenna is of a wheel-and-track design.  The antenna is designed to provide uplink in both S-Band and X-Band (20 kW) either through RCP or LCP. The reception capability will be in both S band and X band (simultaneous RCP and LCP). It can receive two carriers in S band and two carriers in X band. The system will have a G/T of 37.5/51 dB/k (45° elevation, clear sky) for S/X Band. The station may be controlled remotely from the ISTRAC Control Centre (NCC) at Bangalore.

The IDSN facility in Byalalu also houses the ISRO Navigation Centre (INC). The centre became active on 12 June 2013, at the time of launch of IRNSS-1A, the first of the Indian Regional Navigation Satellite System series of satellites. The INC has a high stability atomic clock. It will be used to co-ordinate across 21 ground stations in India.

Antennas (other than ISTRAC)

32 m antenna

The main antenna is a 32-meter Deep Space Antenna. The wheel and track 32 m antenna is a state-of-the-art system that supported the Chandrayaan-1 mission operations. It is currently supporting Mars Orbiter Mission This is co-located with 18 m antenna in the IDSN site at Byalalu. A fibre optics / satellite link will provide the necessary connectivity between the IDSN site and Spacecraft Control Centre / Network Control Centre. This antenna is designed to provide uplink in both S-Band (20/2 kW) and X-Band (2.5 kW), either through RCP or LCP. The reception capability will be in both S-Band and X-Band (simultaneous RCP & LCP). It can receive two carriers in S-Band and one carrier in X-Band, simultaneously. The system will have a G/T of 37.5/51 dB/K (45° elevation, clear sky) for S/X-Band. The base-band will adhere to CCSDS Standards facilitating cross-support among the space agencies. The station is also equipped for remote control from the ISTRAC Network Control Centre (NCC).

18 m antenna

The second antenna is an 18-meter Deep Space Antenna.

11 m antenna

The third antenna is an 11-meter terminal antenna.

Chandrayaan-1

The Indian Deep Space Network was built to track and support India's first lunar mission Chandrayaan-1, an unmanned lunar exploration mission. It was launched on 22 October 2008.  The IDSN was used for tracking, orbit control and housekeeping operations of India's lunar mission for its entire duration of operation (Planned to be 2 years, achieved only 312 days). IDSN began to track Chandrayaan 17 minutes after its launch from the Satish Dhawan Space Launch Centre at Sriharikota, when the probe separated from the launch vehicle.

Mars Orbiter Mission

IDSN is being used to track the ongoing Mars Orbiter Mission (MOM) also known as Mangalyaan.

References

External links

Official ISRO website
Indian Deep Space Network
Official Chandrayaan-1 Website 

Deep Space Network
Indian Space Research Organisation facilities
Buildings and structures in Ramanagara district
2008 establishments in Karnataka
Energy infrastructure completed in 2008